Bersabe;(), or Beer Sheba of the Galilee, was a Second Temple period Jewish village located near the town of Kefar Hananya which marked the boundary between the Upper Galilee and the Lower Galilee, as described by Josephus, with Upper Galilee stretching from Bersabe in the Beit HaKerem Valley to Baca (Peki'in) in the north. Bersabe was one of several towns and villages of Galilee fortified by Josephus during the First Jewish–Roman War, being one of the most defensible positions and where insurgents from across Galilee had taken up refuge against the Imperial Roman army when the surrounding countryside was plundered.

The same site has been rendered by other authors under the name Khirbet Abu esh-Shebaʿ, a little northwest of Kefr ʿAnan and closely adjoining Farradiyya/Parod to their southwest.

In 1873, Kitchener and Conder, on a surveying mission with the Palestine Exploration Fund, visited the site and mentioned it as being "a large ruin, which stands upon the terraced hill top." A survey later conducted at the site reveal that the village had occupied an area of about 70 dunams (17.3 acres).

From a prospect on Mount Kefir in the Mount Meron range, as one looks out over the hilltop ruin of Bersabe, the square layout or lines where once stood the walls of the town can still be distinguished. The line of the ancient wall extended over an area comprising the upper third of the hill. The easternmost wall was built in a zig-zag configuration. The walls were constructed of fieldstones.

Fate of town's defenders 

There are no surviving written records on the fate of the town's defenders, although Josephus alludes to it in his Life's Autobiography (§ 65) where he writes: “...I was in the power of the Romans before Jerusalem was besieged, and before the same time, Jotapata was taken by force, as well as many other fortresses, and a great many of the Galileans fell in the war.” Elsewhere, Josephus writes (The Jewish War 4.7) that after the fall of Tarichaea, all but two of the rebel fortresses and strongholds surrendered to the Roman army. This would have happened in the second year of the war, in the 13th year of Nero's reign, sometime between the capture of Jotapata (in the lunar month of Tammuz) and the capture of Tarichaea (in the month of Elul that same year), and which effectually brought an end to the war in Galilee.

The usual Roman procedure in cases involving open rebellion was to kill the able-bodied men who rose up in rebellion, but to sell into slavery all captive women and children.

Archaeological finds 
Potsherds from the Iron Age, Persian, Hellenistic, Roman, Byzantine and Arab periods have been found on the site. Only one square near the ancient wall has been excavated. Mordechai Aviam who excavated the site has noted that the ancient ruin has yielded large quantities of "Galilean Coarse Ware" (GCW) and other Hellenistic and Early Roman shards and coins. Coins found at the site date from the fourth century BCE to the second century CE. Unidentified razed structures and rock-cut cisterns are scattered across the hilltop. The site also abounds with karstic caves.

Pottery found at the site proves the continuation of the settlement deep into the 3rd century CE.

Further reading 
 Oren Tal, "Fortifications of Josephus in Beersheba of the Galilee", pub. in: Jerusalem and the Land of Israel: Sefer Arieh Kindler (ed. Amar & Zohar), Museum Eretz Israel: Ramat Gan 2000, pp. 155–163 (Hebrew)
 Meyers, E.M., Strange, J.F., and Groh, D.E., "The Meiron Excavation Project: Archaeological Survey in Galilee and Golan, 1976," in: Bulletin of the American Schools of Oriental Research (No. 230 – April 1978), pp. 1–24

Gallery

References

Bibliography 

 Aviam, Mordechai (2008). The Great Revolt in Galilee (Exhibition Catalogue 28), Hecht Museum, University of Haifa: Haifa, pp. 39–52 

 (Leipzig 1907)

External links 
 Survey of Western Palestine, Map 4:   IAA, Wikimedia commons
 Beer Sheba of the Galilee

Historic Jewish communities
Ancient villages in Israel
Ancient Jewish settlements of Galilee
Former populated places in Israel
First Jewish–Roman War
Ancient Jewish history
60s disestablishments in the Roman Empire
Fortifications in Israel
Historic sites in Israel
Geography of Northern District (Israel)